Horace F. Williams (1900 – 29 October 1960) was a Welsh professional footballer.

Williams began his senior career in Scotland, playing for St Johnstone and then Hibernian. He joined Dundee Hibernian in July 1921 for a fee of £30. After scoring 13 goals in 25 appearances, he was transferred to Gillingham in March 1922, having been transfer listed in December for £200. He finished as Dundee Hibs' top scorer despite leaving before the end of the season.

Williams went on to make a total of over 70 English Football League appearances for Gillingham, New Brighton and Blackpool.

References

External links
Horace Williams, www.ihibs.co.uk

1900 births
1960 deaths
Welsh footballers
Gillingham F.C. players
New Brighton A.F.C. players
Blackpool F.C. players
Wrexham A.F.C. players
Macclesfield Town F.C. players
Hereford United F.C. players
St Johnstone F.C. players
Hibernian F.C. players
Dundee United F.C. players
Peterborough & Fletton United F.C. players
Amiens SC players
Welsh football managers
FC Luzern managers
Lovell's Athletic F.C. players
Scottish Football League players
Tunbridge Wells Rangers F.C.
Caernarvon Athletic F.C. players
Association football forwards